Intershop Communications AG is a public e-commerce company headquartered in Jena, within the state of Thuringia in Germany. Customers include large corporations such as HP, BMW, Würth, and Deutsche Telekom. Intershop operates in Europe, the United States of America, and the Asia-Pacific region.

Company history

Intershop was founded in 1992 as NetConsult by Stephan Schambach, Karsten Schneider, and Wilfried Beeck. In 1995, the company created the first German online store.
Also in 1995, they created "Intershop  Online,  the  first  standard  software  for  e-
commerce applications", marketed in the U.S. one year later  (see also Online shopping) and continued to be one of the leading software developers for this early time of the market.

Beyond that it is known as one of the prime German examples of the so-called "New Economy bubble" (company value rose to US$11 billion in 2000 only to fall to penny stock levels in very short time). At one point, a profit warning by Intershop caused widespread losses for other tech companies; for example, even SAP's stock fell by 8%.
The company hardly survived the crash but was able to keep operating and to continue development of its products. In the process, about 30 spin-offs were founded, including Pixaco (later acquired by Hewlett-Packard), ePages and Demandware (later acquired by Salesforce.com).

References

Companies based in San Francisco
Software companies of Germany
Jena